The National League Division Three was the third division of Speedway in the United Kingdom. The league was created as a third tier of the National League in 1947 but ran for only five years. In 1952 it was replaced by the Southern League.

Champions

See also
List of United Kingdom Speedway League Champions

References

 
Speedway leagues
Speedway competitions in the United Kingdom